The 1965 Campeonato Gaúcho was the 45th season of Rio Grande do Sul's top association football league. Grêmio won their 16th title.

Format 

The championship was contested by the twelve teams in a double round-robin system, with the team with the most points winning the title and qualifying to the 1966 Taça Brasil. The last placed team played a two-legged playoff known as Torneio de Morte against the 1965 Second Division champions Riograndense (RG).

Teams 

A. Caxias was known as Flamengo until 1971.
B. Novo Hamburgo was known as Floriano from 1942 until 1968.

Championship

Torneio da Morte

Riograndense are promoted to the 1966 season. Cruzeiro are relegated to the Second Division.

References

Campeonato Gaúcho seasons
1965 in Brazilian football leagues